Trimarcisia (trimarkisia), i. e., "feat of three horsemen", was an ancient Celtic military cavalry tactic or organisation; it is attested in Pausanias' Description of Greece, in which he described the use of trimarcisia by the Gauls during their invasion of Greece in the third century BCE.
According to Pausanias: 
Pausanias' view was that the Gauls had adopted this method of fighting by copying the Persian Athanatoi elite force with the difference that while the Persians waited until after a battle was over to replace casualties, the Gauls "kept reinforcing their full number during the height of the action".

Etymology
According to Pausanias, marka was the Celtic name for a horse. This corresponds to the root *mark-os of words for "saddle horse" attested in Celtic and Germanic but not in other Indo-European languages, a root that is of uncertain etymology.

References

Celtic warfare
Military tactics
Wars involving ancient Greece